Bershka is a Spanish-French clothing retailer company created in 1998 in Spain. It is part of the Spanish Inditex group (which also owns brands such as Zara, Massimo Dutti, Pull&Bear, Oysho, Uterqüe, Stradivarius and Zara Home).

The company was created in April 1998 as a new store and 'fast-fashion' concept, aimed at a young target market. As of January 2022 has over 973 stores in 75 countries. The sales made from Bershka represent 10% of the Inditex.

Gallery

Stores
Bershka has stores in Africa, North and South America, Asia, and Europe, including:

References

External links

 Bershka.com

Companies based in Catalonia
Clothing companies established in 1998
Retail companies established in 1998
Spanish companies established in 1998
Inditex brands
Clothing brands of Spain
Clothing retailers of Spain